Jasmine Nabor (born July 11, 1998) is a Filipina volleyball player. She currently plays for Chery Tiggo Crossovers volleyball team in the Philippine Super Liga.  She is also a member of the Philippines women's national volleyball team.

Clubs
  BaliPure Purest Water Defenders (2017)
  PayMaya High Flyers (2018)
  PLDT Home Fibr Hitters (2018-2019)
  Chery Tiggo Crossovers (2020)

Awards

Individual
 2015 UAAP Season 78 Beach Volleyball "Rookie of the Year"
 2016 Shakey's V-League 13th Season Collegiate Conference "Finals Most Valuable Player" 2017 Premier Volleyball League 1st Season Reinforced Open Conference "Best Setter" 2017 Premier Volleyball League 1st Season Collegiate Conference "Finals Most Valuable Player"''

Collegiate
 2016 Shakey's V-League 13th Season Collegiate Conference -  Champions,  with NU Lady Bulldogs
 2017 Premier Volleyball League 1st Season Collegiate Conference -  Champions,  with NU Lady Bulldogs
 2018 UAAP Season 80 -  Bronze medal, with NU Lady Bulldogs

Club
  2017 Premier Volleyball League 1st Season Reinforced Open Conference -  Silver medal,  with BaliPure Purest Water Defenders
  2017 Premier Volleyball League 1st Season Open Conference -  Champions,  with BaliPure Purest Water Defenders
 2018 Premier Volleyball League Reinforced Conference -  Silver medal,  with PayMaya High Flyers
 2019 Philippine Super Liga Grand Prix Conference -  Bronze medal,  with PLDT Home Fibr Hitters

References

 
 1998 births
Living people
University Athletic Association of the Philippines volleyball players
Filipino women's volleyball players
Setters (volleyball)